Lallasi Pal is a 2002 Indian Meitei language film directed by Mayanglangbam Raghumani (Eepu) and starring Lairenjam Olen and Manda Leima. The film released in Friends Talkies theatre, Imphal in 2002 and was a blockbuster.

This film was important in marking the transition from celluloid to digital films for Manipuri cinema after Lammei (2002). This film was a breakthrough for Olen and Manda.

Cast 
 Lairenjam Olen as Tompok
 Manda Leima as Leihao
 Tayenjam Mema
 Samjetsabam Mangoljao as Ibohal
 Benu
 Bimola as Kaboklei
 Brajalal as Brojen
 Memcha
 Nandababu
 London
 Master Bungnao
 Baby R.K. Nirupama as Bembem
 James as James
 Sophia
 Ahanjao (Guest Artiste)
 Phulka (Guest Artiste)

Soundtrack

Reception 
Writing for Sangai Express, Akoijam opined that this was one of the films in which Olen "gave a measured and convinincing performance". The writer added that Manda "gave a life time performance in the film Lallasi Pal, a run for her money. Manda’s performance in the said film is an exemplar of how one enters under the skin of the character. Indeed, Manda is not Manda but Leihao in Lalasi Pal".

Accolades
Olen won the award for Best Actor - Male at the Festival of Manipur Cinema in 2007.

References 

Meitei-language films
2002 films
Cinema of Manipur